Laura H. Greene is the Marie Krafft Professor of Physics at Florida State University and Chief Scientist at the National High Magnetic Field Laboratory.  She was previously a professor of physics at the University of Illinois at Urbana-Champaign.  In September 2021, she was appointed to the President's Council of Advisors on Science and Technology (PCAST).

She is noted for her research on Andreev bound states and is an expert in strongly correlated Fermionic systems. During the discoveries of the first high transition temperature (Hi-Tc) superconductors she and collaborators from AT&T laboratories, were amongst the first to report on the role of oxygen and crystal structure in the copper-oxides. Laura Greene is a champion for diversity and is active in promoting equal rights for women and minorities. She is a member of the American Physical Society Professional Skills Development (previously COACh) team, a cohort of APS members who are trained to facilitate sessions that aim to strengthen women's communication, mentoring and negotiation skills in STEM fields.

Biography
As a child Laura Greene always had an intense curiosity about the working of the natural things around her and took a liking of the sciences. But, as a teen growing up in a culturally vibrant and diverse neighborhood of Cleveland, Ohio, she was also passionately attracted to music, especially folk music often singing and playing guitar at coffee houses and parties. Music remains an important constant in her life, she enjoys performing and is a regular participant in the American Physical Society (APS) March Meeting "Physics Songs" symposia.  She is the mother of two grown up sons.

Laura Greene has held numerous professional positions at institutions all over the world. From 1992 to 2015 she was a permanent member of the faculty of the University of Illinois at Urbana-Champaign (UIUC). At UIUC she held the Swanlund endowed chair professor of physics, Center for Advanced Study professor of physics and Co-Associate Director, Center for Emergent Superconductivity (CES) Energy Frontier Research, Department of Physics, Materials Research laboratory (MRL), center for Nanoscale Science & Technology, UIUC, IL 61801-3080, USA.  Since 2015, she has been on the faculty at Florida State University (FSU) in the Department of Physics and Chief Scientist at the National High Magnetic Field Laboratory.  She is also a member of the physics faculty at the University of Florida.

Education, career and major professional contributions
Laura Greene studied physics as an undergraduate at Ohio State University and was awarded a cum laude BS, (1974) degree and Master's (MS) in 1978. For higher education she joined Cornell University.  At Cornell, first she was awarded a MS in experimental physics (1980) and then in (1984) she completed a PhD degree in condensed matter physics.

With her PhD she joined the fabled AT&T Bell Labs in Murray Hills in New Jersey (NJ) and later Bellcore, Red Bank also in NJ. The first ever evidence of, high critical temperature (high-Tc) superconductivity was reported (1986) by Bednoz and Muller, two researchers at the IBM's research laboratory in Zurich, Switzerland. Within months, the IBM report was followed up with discoveries of far higher temperature superconductors from all over the world and publicized by professional events like the Woodstock of physics in the March meetings of the American Physical Society in 1987 & 1988; the first one was in New York city and the next in New Orleans, Louisiana. Greene and colleagues then still at AT&T were amongst the first groups to make a number of key contributions, especially discovering the remarkable sensitivity of the superconducting transition, in the '123- materials', to the exact amount of oxygen present, as well as the interdependence of atomic crystal structure and chemical composition with superconductivity. They reported these results in the first couple of conferences such as the one in Anaheim, California in the spring, 1987 meeting of the Materials Research Society (MRS) and the Berkeley meeting later in the summer that same year. The Anaheim meeting was attended by Karl Alexander Muller, the original co-discoverer of high-Tc and Nobel Prize (1987) winner for the discovery of high temperature superconductivity. Greene's pioneering contribution was recognized in the first book on this subject, "Copper-oxide Superconductors", and in other highly cited research articles. She was also a panelist at the Woodstock-II.

Since the early days Greene has continued research on unconventional or novel superconducting materials, especially by Andreev reflection (PCAR) spectroscopy, demonstration of Andreev bound states, and a wide range of symmetry breaking phenomena, including time-reversal symmetry breaking.
Her recent work include quantum mechanics on a macroscopic level, strongly correlated materials, PCAR experiments in Heavy fermion superconductor systems, and others.

Professionally at UIUC Laura Greene has been influenced by John Bardeen (the only double Nobel Laureate in physics) and Anthony Leggett (another physics Nobelist); she has worked with many other scientists, including B. Batlogg, Malcolm R. Beasley, R. A. Buhrman, David Ceperley, Timir Datta, Mildred Dresselhaus, Robert C. Dynes, A. J. Epstein, Theodore H. Geballe, Nigel Goldenfeld, David C. Larbalestier,  W. E. Moerner, T.P. Orlando, David B. Tanner, J. M. Tarascon, T. Timusk, Dale Van Harlingen and others.

Outreach and societal awareness
Laura Greene is committed to equal rights for women and minorities in education and in the work place, particularly when it comes to the hard sciences and the engineering professions; she also actively promotes awareness and sensitivity towards people who face difficult health challenges. She is a Co-founder of the Forum on Outreach and Engaging the Public (FOEP), and a member of Committee on Informing the Public, both parts of the American Physical Society. Laura Greene was on  'BOOST/Grantwriting/Indonesia Advisory Board'; part of COACH International, for the Kavli Frontiers of Science Indonesia Meeting, Bali, Indonesia, and she has served on the Argonne Education and Outreach Council for the Division of Educational Programs, Argonne National Laboratory (Argonne-U/Chicago-LLC).

Recent outreach and public service
 Popular article: 
 Popular article: 
 Organizer and chair for the 2013 APS March Meeting "Physics for Everyone" DMP symposium, March 20, 2013, Baltimore, MD.

Selected awards and honors
 American Physical Society Five Sigma Physicist Award for Advocacy in Science Policy, 2019.
 Tallahassee Scientific Society Gold Medal Award, 2019.
 President, American Physical Society, 2017 (Vice-Chair 2015, Chair-Elect 2016, Chair 2017, Past Chair 2018).
 Chair, Division of Materials Physics (DMP) of the American Physical Society, elected 2012 (Vice-Chair 2012; Chair-Elect 2013; Chair 2014; Past Chair 2015).
 US delegate to the Commission on Structure and Dynamics of Condensed Matter (C10), International Union of Pure and Applied Physicists (IUPAP), elected 2011 for a three-year term.
 U. S. Liaison Committee, International Union of Pure and Applied Physicists (IUPAP), elected 2011 for a three-year term.
 External Advisory Panel, Argonne Materials Advisory Board, 2010 – present.
 Co-chair (with R. L. Greene) of the ICAM International Working Group on New Superconductors, 2010 – present.
 Joseph S. Guggenheim Foundation Fellowship, 2009-10.
 Fellowship Selection Committee, Institute of Physics (IoP – UK), 2007 – present.
 The Board on Physics and Astronomy of the National Academy of Sciences (BPA-NAS), 2003–2006 and 2008–2014.
 Fellow, Institute of Physics, "FInstP", UK, elected 2007.
 Member, National Academy of Sciences, elected 2006.
 Founding member, board of trustees, board of governors, Institute for Complex and Adaptive Materials (ICAM), University of California, 1999 – present.
 Fellow, American Academy of Arts and Sciences, elected 1997.
 Fellow, The American Association for the Advancement of Science, elected 1996.
 Maria Goeppert-Mayer Award of the American Physical Society, 1994.
 Fellow, American Physical Society, elected 1993.
 Panelist, Woodstock of Physics-II, Triple-digit superconductivity in the Copper-oxide system, New Orleans, March 1988.

Publications
 L. H. Greene, R. T. Warner, W. E. Moerner, A. J. Sievers and J. F. Figueira, "Passive mode locking of a TEA(CO2) laser with matrix-isolated SF6", Journal of the Optical Society of American 70, 640-641 (1980).
 L. H. Greene, D. B. Tanner and A. J. Epstein, "Optical properties of the cation- deficient platinum chain salt, K1.75Pt(CN)4•1.5H2O", Physical Review B 25, 1331-1339 (1982).
 L. H. Greene, W. L. Feldmann, J.-M. Rowell, B. Batlogg, E. M. Gyorgy, W. P. Lowe and D. B. McWhan, "Structural, magnetic and superconducting properties of rare-earth/superconductor multilayer films", Superlattices and Microstructures, 1, 407-415 (1985).
 L. H. Greene, W. L. Feldmann and J.-M. Rowell, "Proximity-effect studies of Nb-based bilayers with s-p, rare-earth and heavy-fermion metals", Physica B 135, 77-80 (1985).
 J.-M. Tarascon, L. H. Greene, W. R. McKinnon, G. W. Hull and T. H. Geballe, "Superconductivity at 40K in the Oxygen-Defect Perovskites La2-xSrxCuO4-y", Science 235, 1373-1376 (1987).
 J. M. Tarascon, W. R. McKinnon, L. H. Greene, G. W. Hull, B. G. Bagley, E. M. Vogel and Y. LePage, "Oxygen Doping of the High Tc Superconducting Perovskites" in High Temperature Superconductors, D. V. Gubser and M. Schluter, eds., (Materials Research Society, Pittsburgh, PA 1987) pp. 65–67.
 J.-M. Tarascon, P. Barboux, L. H. Greene, G. W. Hull and B. G. Bagley, "3d-Metal Doping (Fe, Co, Ni, Zn) of the High Tc Perovskite YBa2Cu3O7-y", in High Temperature Superconductors, M. N. Brodsky, R. C. Dynes, H. L. Tuller and K. Kitazawa, eds., (Materials Research Society, Pittsburgh, PA, 1988) pp. 523–526.
 L. H. Greene, J.-M. Tarascon, P. F. Miceli, B. G. Bagley, P. Barboux, M. Giroud, G. W. Hull, Y. LePage, W. R. McKinnon, J. J. Rhyne and D. A. Neumann, "Recent Magnetic and Structural Studies of the High-Tc Cuprates at Bellcore", in Proceedings for SC-GLOBAL-89; International Superconductor Applications Convention, San Francisco, CA, V. Nurenberg, ed., January 11–13, 1989.
 L. H. Greene, A. Kastalsky, J. B. Barner and R. Bhat, "Superconductive Proximity-Effects in Nb on InGaAs-Based Heterostructures", Physica B 165-166, 1573-1574 (1990).
 L. H. Greene, M. Covington, M. Aprili, E. Paraoanu, "Tunneling into Andreev Bound States of YBa2Cu3O7:  Observation of Broken Time-Reversal Symmetry", The Journal of Physics and Chemistry of Solids, 59, 2021-2025, (1998).
 H. Aubin, L. H. Greene, S. Jian and D. G. Hinks, "Andreev Bound States at the Onset of Phase Coherence in Bi2Sr2CaCu2O8", Physical Review Letters, 89, 177001-177004 (2002).
 L. H. Greene, "Data Dips and Peaks", Physics Today 58, 58 (2005).
 Laura H. Greene, "'Key issues' articles in Reports on Progress in Physics", Reports on Progress in Physics 70, 1 (2007).
 Laura H. Greene, "Taming Serendipity", Physics World, 24, 41-43 (2011).
 Laura H. Greene, Hamood Z. Arham, Cassandra R. Hunt, and Wan Kyu Park, "Design of new superconducting materials, and point contact spectroscopy as a probe of strong electronic correlations", Journal of Superconductivity and Novel Magnetism 25, 2121-2126 (2012).

References

External links
 University of Illinois Urbana-Champaign profile
National Academy of Sciences; News Laura Greene
 Azom.com;News Point-Contact Spectroscopy Deepens Mystery of Heavy-Fermion Superconductors
 YouTube;Laura Greene Laura Greene
 APS.org; Meeting APS -APS March Meeting 2013 - Session Index MAR13

Year of birth missing (living people)
Living people
American women physicists
Fellows of the American Physical Society
Members of the United States National Academy of Sciences
Florida State University faculty
University of Illinois Urbana-Champaign faculty
Ohio State University College of Arts and Sciences alumni
Cornell University alumni
20th-century American physicists
21st-century American physicists
21st-century American women scientists
Ohio State University Graduate School alumni
20th-century American women scientists
American women academics
Presidents of the American Physical Society